Moni Kovačič (born Monique De Haviland) is a US-based Slovenian former pop singer, especially well known in SFR Yugoslavia during the late 1970s and early 1980s due to her hit single "Brez ljubezni mi živeti ni" (No use living without love), released in 1978 by the label ZKP RTVLj. Album releases were Zagonetka (Puzzle) and Može i jače (Can do it stronger). She was featured as a playmate in the Yugoslavian men's magazine .

Born in 1960 to an American father Bill De Haviland and a Slovenian mother Brigita Kovačič, Monique grew up in Connecticut and took up performing from an early age.

References

External links
 
 

Living people
20th-century Slovenian women singers
1960 births
20th-century American women singers
20th-century American singers
American people of Slovenian descent
Yugoslav women singers
21st-century American women